The MT Stolt Valor is a Hong Kong-flagged ship that was hijacked while in the Designated Safety Corridor within the Gulf of Aden, approximately  away from the coast of Yemen, while heading from the United States south through the Gulf towards Asia. After the ship passed through the Suez Canal, it encountered hijackers and alerted the International Maritime Bureau. Area coalition forces arrived too late to avert the hijacking which occurred at 10:16 UTC on September 15, 2008 by Somali pirates.

The Japanese-owned chemical tanker, managed by Fleet Management Ltd. of Hong Kong, and on time charter to Stolt Tankers, carried a crew of 22 members, including eighteen from India, two from the Philippines, one from Bangladesh, and one from Russia according to Fleet's spokesman, Ferdi Stolzenberg. The ship's captain is Prabhat Kumar Goyal of Teg Bahadur Road, Dehradun. The ship was carrying 19,800 metric tons of phosphoric acid, loaded in Morehead City, North Carolina, United States,
at time of capture.

Following capture, the Stolt Valor made way to the pirate haven of Eyl on the eastern coast of Somalia. The pirates made contact with the ship's owners the following day, September 16.  The ship's Master, through email and phone, stated that his crew was unharmed and confined to the ship’s wheelhouse.

Ransom
An initial demand of ransom for US$6 million was later decreased to US$2.5 million. The ransom negotiations were conducted by National Union of Seafarers of India (NUSI) General Secretary Abdul Gani in Hong Kong, saying "Definitely ransom has been paid but we will not be able to go into details."

Release
The Stolt Valor was released the morning of November 16, 2008.

2012 fire
The ship was carrying a cargo of methyl tertiary butyl ether and isobutanol. One crew member was killed.

Scrap
The fire was eventually extinguished and all pollutants - both chemical cargo and fuel - later removed, but the ship was forced to drift in the Gulf for several months before authorities in Bahrain offered it a port of refuge. Stolt Valor was deemed too badly damaged for repairs to be economically viable and the ship owners and managers STOLT, decided to scrap it. She was scrapped in mid-October 2012 in Bahrain.

See also
Piracy in Somalia

References

Piracy in Somalia
Chemical tankers
Merchant ships of Hong Kong
2003 ships
Maritime incidents in 2008
Maritime incidents in 2012